Christina Morhaubt (née Merkhlein; died 4 August 1627, Zeil am Main) was a victim of the Bamberg witch trials. 

She was married to the city Councillor and mayor of Bamberg, Johann Morhaubt and had two sons. After a bad harvest, which was rumored to be caused by magic, a witch panic erupted in Bamberg in 1626. Christina Morhaubt was arrested 9 April 1627. Her arrest developed into the arrest of people belonging to the city's upper classes, which brought in a considerable fortune in confiscated goods for the city government. She confessed under torture to have been converted to a witch by her mother, Dorl Greifin, eleven years earlier. Her confession resulted in the arrest of her maids, Kunigunth Weberin, who named Christina's son Hans, and Ellin Helena von Kronach, who named the wives of mayor Georg Neudecker, mayor Johannes Junius and mayor Dietmeyer, and Katherina Haan (wife of Councillor Georg Haan). 

When her son, 14 year old Hans Morhaubt, was interrogated in June, he pointed out his younger brother Martin and several members of the Haan family as members of the witch coven. He was considered such an important witness that he was kept alive until January 1628, used to point out more people to be arrested and to give testimony against Georg Haan and his daughter. Christina Morhaubt was judged guilty as charged and burned alive in August 1627 in Zeil am Main. Hans Morhaubt was likely executed in April 1628.

References

 Britta Gehm, Die Hexenverfolgung im Hochstift Bamberg und das Eingreifen des Reichshofrates (RHR) zu ihrer Beendigung, Olms-Verlag, Hildesheim, 2000, S. 136–138; 2. Auflage 2011, 

1627 deaths
Year of birth unknown
Place of birth unknown
People executed for witchcraft
People executed in the Holy Roman Empire by burning
17th-century German people
17th-century executions in the Holy Roman Empire
Bamberg witch trials